The Negro Middleweight Championship of the World was a title in pretense claimed by Johnny Banks, an African American boxer (born December 25, 1861, in Richmond, Virginia) who fought under the sobriquet "The Darkey Wizard" during the mid-1880s. He claimed the Negro Middleweight Championship but lost it in a title fight on 26 Jan 1887 in New York City to James Desverney when he was disqualified in the ninth round on a foul. (Desverney apparently never defended the title.)

Banks's next fight was with future colored middleweight champ Ed Binney in Boston, in which they drew in the scheduled 13 rounds after going easy on each other, to the disgust of the crowd and the bout promoters. Faced with losing their purses, the fighters fought another three rounds and Binney won the fight.

The title was doomed when Desverney failed to defend it and Harris Martin, "The Black Pearl", declared himself the world colored middleweight champion after beating "Black Frank" Taylor in Minneapolis, Minnesota on 2 May 1887.  Harris lost his title to Ed Binney on 30 November 1891  in San Francisco, California.

The Black Pearl fought and was defeated by Charley Turner, "The Stockton Cyclone", in his next fight on 29 February 1892. Turner claimed the colored middleweight title but The Black Pearl already had lost it to Binney.  Binney was considered the lineal colored middleweight champ, and he also had defeated the former holder of the Negro middleweight title, which went into abeyance.

List of champions 
Two men were recognized as World Negro Heavyweight Champion, a title that went into abeyance as the World Colored Middleweight Championship became the recognized title for African American boxers in that weight class.

See also
World Colored Middleweight Championship

References

Defunct boxing titles